Hi-Lite Records was a South Korean independent record label founded in 2010 by rapper Paloalto.

Partnership with CJ E&M 
It was announced in October 2015 that the entertainment company CJ E&M would be acquiring the label. Representatives stated the company would provide the label assistance in funding, marketing and expanding a global network, allowing it to solely focus on music.

Accolades 
 Won both "Album of the Year" (Hi-Life) and "Label of the Year" in the 2013 hiphopplaya awards.
 Won "Song of the Year" and "Music Video of the Year" with Keith Ape's "It G Ma" in the 2015 hiphopplaya awards

Artists  
 Paloalto (Founder and Former CEO)
 Pinodyne (Huckleberry P & Soul Fish)
 Reddy
 Soul One
 Camo Starr (CEO)
 Beshade
 Swervy 
 Soovi
 Jerd
 Ash-B

Former 
 Evo
 DJ Djanga
 GLV
 TKO
 DJ Frekeey
 Bella
 Keith Ape
 211
 B-Free (left 7 May 2016)
 Okasian (left 27 May 2016)
 G2
 YunB
 Jowonu
 Sway D

Discography 
 HI-LITE Records - HI-LIFE (2013)
 The Cohort – Orca-Tape (2013)

External links

References 

Companies based in Seoul
Record labels established in 2010
South Korean hip hop record labels
Labels distributed by CJ E&M Music and Live
Defunct record labels of South Korea